Ogdoconta is a genus of moths of the family Noctuidae.

Species
 Ogdoconta altura Barnes, 1904
 Ogdoconta cinereola (Guenée, 1852)
 Ogdoconta cymographa Hampson, 1910
 Ogdoconta fergusoni Metzler & Lafontaine, 2013
 Ogdoconta gamura Schaus, 1921
 Ogdoconta justitia Dyar, 1919
 Ogdoconta lilacina (Druce, 1890)
 Ogdoconta margareta Crabo, 2015
 Ogdoconta moreno Barnes, 1907
 Ogdoconta muscula (Schaus, 1898)
 Ogdoconta plumbea Dyar, 1912
 Ogdoconta pulverulenta Schaus, 1911
 Ogdoconta pulvilinea Schaus, 1911
 Ogdoconta rufipenna Metzler, Knudson & Poole, 2013
 Ogdoconta satana Meztler, Knudson & Poole, 2013
 Ogdoconta sexta Barnes & McDunnough, 1913
 Ogdoconta tacna (Barnes, 1904)

References

 , 2013: A review of the genus Ogdoconta Butler (Lepidoptera, Noctuidae, Condicinae, Condicini) from North America north of Mexico with descriptions of three new species. Zookeys 264: 165–191. Abstract and full article: .

External links

Condicinae